Can You Keep a Secret? may refer to:

 "Can You Keep a Secret?" (song) by Hikaru Utada
 Can You Keep a Secret? (novel) by Sophie Kinsella
 Can You Keep a Secret? (film) directed by Elise Duran